Lanthanostegus is an extinct genus of non-mammalian synapsids from the Capitanian Tapinocephalus Assemblage Zone, Koonap Formation (Beaufort Group) of South Africa.

See also 
 List of therapsids

References 

 The main groups of non-mammalian synapsids at Mikko's Phylogeny Archive

Anomodont genera
Permian synapsids of Africa
Fossils of South Africa
Fossil taxa described in 2003